Rupohihat Assembly constituency is one of the 126 assembly constituencies of Assam Legislative Assembly. Rupohihat forms part of the Kaliabor Lok Sabha constituency.

Members of Legislative Assembly 
 1957: Mohammad Idris, Indian National Congress
 1962: Abu Nasar Mohammad Ohid, Indian National Congress
 1967: M. A. Mosabbir, Independent
 1972: Mohammad Idris, Indian National Congress
 1978: Mohammad Idris, Indian National Congress
 1983: Mohammad Idris, Indian National Congress
 1985: Rashidul Haque, Independent
 1991: Rashidul Haque, Indian National Congress
 1996: Rashidul Haque, Indian National Congress
 2001: Sarifa Begum, Indian National Congress
 2006: Abdul Aziz, Asom Gana Parishad
 2011: Mazibur Rahman, All India United Democratic Front

Election results

2016

See also
List of constituencies of the Assam Legislative Assembly
Nagaon district

References

External links 
 

Assembly constituencies of Assam
Nagaon district